Jan Fredrik Christiansen (born April 1, 1942) was principal trumpeter with the Oslo Philharmonic Orchestra from 1973 until 2007.

Christiansen is also professor at the Norwegian Academy of Music and principal trumpet of the Oslo Sinfonietta. He joined the Philharmonic in 1966 and became principal in 1973, replacing Harry Kvebæk, and has performed in all of the orchestra's recordings since that time. He was a student of Harry Kvebæk, William Overton and Adolph Herseth. In 1985 he premiered Olav Anton Thommessen's trumpet concerto The Second Creation.

References 

1942 births
Living people
Norwegian classical musicians
Norwegian trumpeters
Male trumpeters
21st-century trumpeters
21st-century Norwegian male musicians